Bjarne Sandvik Stugu (born 23 April 1956) is a Norwegian physicist. He is a professor at the Department of Physics and Technology, within the research group for subatomic physics, at the University of Bergen. His research is mainly focusing on experimental particle physics. Stugu participated in the experimental discovery of the Higgs particle in 2012.

Stugu graduated in physics in 1983 and obtained his PhD in 1987, both for work related to the R704 experiment at the ISR. He was a researcher at Forschungszentrum Jülich from 1990 to 1992. During this period he continued his activities within the JETSET Collaboration, a LEAR experiment carried out at CERN. He became a professor at the University of Bergen in 1992 and became then also a member of the DELPHI Collaboration, a CERN LEP experiment.  

He teaches experimental physics, quantum mechanics and electromagnetism.

Stugu participates in the ATLAS experiment at CERN since its start in 2009. He was awarded, together with Marjorie Shapiro, the Peder Sather Grant in 2012 for Developing pixel read-out electronics for experiments at CERN LHC. His research group has developed detectors in the LHC as well as systems for operating the LHC.

References 

1956 births
People associated with CERN

Norwegian physicists
Academic staff of the University of Bergen
Living people